Hans-Wilhelm Müller-Wohlfahrt (born 12 August 1942 in Leerhafe, today part of Wittmund, East Frisia) is a German orthopedist. He gained recognition for his roles as Germany national football team doctor (1995–2018) and club doctor of Bayern Munich (1977–2015, 2017–2020). He initially resigned after him and his medical staff were blamed for a 3–1 loss to Porto in a UEFA Champions League match during the tenure of coach Pep Guardiola, but he rejoined after the reappointment of Jupp Heynckes as head coach. Having already resigned from his position at the Germany national football team in 2018, his second and final resignation at Bayern Munich also came into effect on the 30th of June 2020. 

Many of the German doctor's treatments are seen as controversial, including using injections of a substance called Hyalart, extracted from the crest of cockerels, which is claimed to help lubricate knee injuries and take away the pain. He has also injected Myo-Melcain, which is the painkiller Procaine in a honey solution, or Actovegin into patients' muscles.

Müller-Wohlfahrt's use of homeopathic medicine to treat players is also controversial.

Players treated
He has treated many footballers and athletes including Jürgen Klinsmann, Ronaldo and Jonathan Woodgate, Kelly Holmes, Maurice Greene and Usain Bolt.

He helped cure Michael Owen's hamstring problems in time to play at the Euro 2000 tournament and has also helped Owen's Liverpool and England colleague, Steven Gerrard and Harry Kewell.

Darren Gough and Alex Tudor, Essex cricketers, have benefited from the German doctor's pioneering treatments. On 6 May 2009 it was announced that he was helping Akpo Sodje recover from a longstanding hamstring problem.

José María Olazábal, the 1994 US Masters golf champion was suffering from the crippling effects of rheumatoid arthritis when he visited Müller-Wohlfahrt but was able to win at Augusta again in 1999.

Rugby World Cup winner Will Greenwood is another who has benefited from the doctor's treatment after 8 months with a groin problem. Weeks later he was staking a claim to a recall to the England team.

Even international sportsmen as far away as Australia have sought treatment from Müller-Wohlfahrt – Australian rules footballers Ben Reid, Max Rooke and Mark Coughlan were treated for chronic soft tissue injuries. Likewise he has also treated professional cyclists including Stephen Roche.

One of his more unusual treatments was when St Johnstone F.C. striker Peter MacDonald was prescribed goat's blood injections in a bid to cure a recurring hamstring problem.

In 2010, he treated Bono (singer for U2) and Usain Bolt for severe back injury.

In 2012, he was given the job of repairing the hamstring of Dylan Grimes of the AFL club the Richmond Tigers.

In 2016 Usain Bolt devoted his 100 m sprint gold medal at the 2016 Olympics in Rio to Müller-Wohlfahrt, who was at the stadium, after having received treatments from him for a previous calf injury.

In 2019, he worked on Collingwood Magpie AFL Jordan De Goey in a bid to get his injured hamstring resolved in time to play in the AFL Grand Final if the team get through their penultimate match against the GWS Giants.

Works
Mensch, beweg dich!, Zabert Sandmann, 
So schützen Sie Ihre Gesundheit, Zabert Sandmann, 
So gewinnen Sie mehr Lebenskraft, Zabert Sandmann, 
Verletzt, was tun?, with Hans-Jürgen Montag, 
Besser trainieren!, Zabert Sandmann,

References

External links

1942 births
Living people
People from Wittmund
FC Bayern Munich non-playing staff
German sports physicians